Caesar, Life of a Colossus is a biography of Julius Caesar written by Adrian Goldsworthy and published in 2006 by Yale University Press It outlines his life in the context of the many institutions with which he interacted: "Roman society, the politics of the senate,  Gaul (ancient France)" as well as the army of that ancient republic.

Within that framework, during his fifty-six year lifetime, he fulfilled many roles: "including a fugitive, prisoner, rising politician, army leader, legal advocate, rebel, dictator – perhaps even a god – as well as a husband, father, lover and adulterer. Few fictional heroes have ever done as much as Caius Julius Caesar."

One underlying structure of this book is to take the reader on a journey that follows "the many gambles, strange turns, and unlikely incidents in Caesar's career."
The book is referenced with endnotes and an index, located in the back of the book, showing it is based on ancient scholarly sources. The work of sifting through these sometimes conflicting sources to tell the story is also part of the narrative.

Additionally, a bibliography of scholarly commentary, published during our more modern age, regarding Julius Caesar and Ancient Rome during his lifetime, is also in the back of the book.  Hence, although the author has written this book for the lay reader, it is also useful for scholarly study.

About the author
Adrian Goldsworthy attended St John's College, Oxford University where he received a Ph.D. in Literae Humaniores (Ancient History) in 1994. His first book,The Roman Army at War, 100 BC - AD 200 was published in 1996 and based on his Ph.D. thesis entitled The Roman Army as a fighting force, 100 BC-AD 200. He was a part-time assistant professor at King's College London, and was later an assistant professor at the University of Notre Dame, London for six years. He has lectured on Greek and Roman history and taught a course on the military history of World War II at Notre Dame. Currently, he is a full time writer, preferring this occupation to teaching.

Before publishing Caesar, Life of a Colossus he wrote two other important books on Roman history: The Complete Roman Army and The Fall of Carthage. 
He has subsequently written five other books about aspects of life in Ancient Rome. The latest one was published in 2018 entitled Hadrian's Wall

References

Scholarly reviews

Further reading
 
 C-SPAN. Video. October .  "Book Discussion on Caesar: Life of a Colossus". Adrian Goldsworthy discusses his biographical work on Julius Caesar. For the audience, Goldsworthy characterizes "the life of ancient Rome’s ruler from birth to assassination, detailing Caesar’s successes and failures as a politician and his involvement with the wives of his two main political rivals."
Ashbrook, Tom. Author interview. On Point radio broadcast. September 15, 2006. Available online. WBUR (syndicated by NPR). Retrieved September 22, 2019.
 "Review of Goldsworthy's Caesar Life of a Colossus". N.S. Gill. About.com/Education. 
 Review by Hahn, Irene: " Caesar: Life of a Colossus, by Adrian Goldsworthy". About.com/Education.
 Allen, Walter, Jr. "Sallust's Political Career." Studies in Philology 51.1 (Jan. 1954): 1–14. Rpt. in Classical and Medieval Literature Criticism. Ed. Janet Witalec. Vol. 68. Detroit: Gale, 2004. Literature Resource Center. Web. 7 June 2015.

2006 non-fiction books
Biographies about politicians
Depictions of Julius Caesar in literature
Historical literature
History books about ancient Rome
Yale University Press books
Works about Julius Caesar